Carrhenes is a genus of skippers in the family Hesperiidae.

Species
Recognised species in the genus Carrhenes include:
 Carrhenes chaeremon Mabille, 1891
 Carrhenes conia Evans, 1953
 Carrhenes decens (Butler, 1874)
 Carrhenes fuscescens (Mabille, 1891)

Former species
Carrhenes callipetes Godman and Salvin, [1895] - transferred to Canesia callipetes (Godman and Salvin, [1895])
Carrhenes canescens (R.Felder, 1869) - transferred to Canesia canescens (R.Felder, 1869)
Carrhenes lilloi Hayward, 1947 - transferred to Canesia lilloi (Hayward, 1947)
Carrhenes meridensis Godman and Salvin, [1895] - transferred to Canesia meridensis (Godman and Salvin, [1895])
Carrhenes pallida Röber,  1925 - transferred to Canesia pallida (Röber,  1925)
Carrhenes recurva Austin, 2000 - transferred to Canesia recurva (Austin, 2000)
Carrhenes santes Bell, 1940 - transferred to Santa santes (Bell, 1940)

References

Natural History Museum Lepidoptera genus database

Pyrgini
Hesperiidae genera
Taxa named by Frederick DuCane Godman
Taxa named by Osbert Salvin